Dabur Vatika Miss Nepal 2007, the 12th Miss Nepal pageant held on April 7, 2007, at the Birendra International Conference Convention Centre in Nepal. It was won by Sitashma Chand, of Lalitpur.

The event was surrounded by heavy protests from Maoist and Feminist activists. The show was broadcast live by Nepal Television but suffered from minor technical glitches. The chief judge of the event, Kollywood actor Rajesh Hamal, asked the top 5 finalists, "Are all traditions to be followed without question or do they need to be discussed and amended?"

The contestants were supported by fashion designer groups INIFD, NEFT, Lakhotia and others. The event differed from previous pageants in that it featured modifications of Nepal's traditional ethnic dresses. Designs from INIFD (International Institute of Fashion Design) were judged to be better than the dresses from competing designers.

The winner of Miss Nepal 2007, Sitashma Chand, represented Nepal in the Miss World 2007 pageant in Sanya, China. The 1st runner up, Bandana Sharma, represented Nepal in the Miss Earth 2007 pageant in Nha Trang, Vietnam.

Results

Color keys

Sub-Titles

Contestants

References

External links
 Miss Nepal website
 Miss Nepal 2007 Website

Beauty pageants in Nepal
2007 in Nepal
Miss Nepal